Pisonia wagneriana, the pāpala kēpau or  Kauai catchbirdtree, is a species of flowering tree in the Bougainvillea family, Nyctaginaceae, that is endemic to Kauai in the Hawaiian Islands. It is threatened by habitat loss.

References

Endemic flora of Hawaii
Trees of Hawaii
wagneriana
Endangered plants
Taxonomy articles created by Polbot